The 1920 Clemson Tigers football team represented Clemson Agricultural College—now known as Clemson University—as a member of the Southern Intercollegiate Athletic Association (SIAA) during the 1920 college football season. Led by Edward Donahue in his fourth and final season as head coach, the Tigers compiled an overall record of 4–6–1 with a mark of 2–6 in SIAA play. Boo Armstrong was the team captain.

Schedule

References

Bibliography
 

Clemson
Clemson Tigers football seasons
Clemson Tigers football